George John Knight (9 February 1887 – 13 January 1947) was an Australian rules footballer who played with Melbourne in the Victorian Football League (VFL).

Notes

External links 

 

1887 births
1947 deaths
Australian rules footballers from Victoria (Australia)
Melbourne Football Club players
Brighton Football Club players